The 1987 NCAA Division I Men's Golf Championships were contested at the 49th annual NCAA-sanctioned golf tournament for determining the individual and team national champions of men's collegiate golf at the Division I level in the United States.

The tournament was held at the Ohio State University Golf Club in Columbus, Ohio.

Oklahoma State won the team championship, the Cowboys' sixth NCAA title and first since 1983.

Future professional Brian Watts, also from Oklahoma State, won the individual title.

Individual results

Individual champion
 Brian Watts, Oklahoma State (280)

Team results

Finalists

Missed cut

DC = Defending champions
Debut appearance

References

NCAA Men's Golf Championship
Golf in Ohio
NCAA Golf Championship
NCAA Golf Championship
NCAA Golf Championship